Emurua Dikirr is an electoral constituency in Kenya. It is one of six constituencies of Narok County. The constituency was established for the 2013 elections. Since the 2013 Kenyan General Elections, Johana Kipyegon Ngeno represented the constituency in the Kenyan National Assembly. Ngeno was re-elected in 2017 as a coalition member of The Eagle Coalition and is the current Member of Parliament. the constituency has 95% christians and 2% muslims(most of them living in Chebaibai near Murkan).It is located in Narok county and famously known as Transmara East. Johana was reelected in 2022 as the MP.Its backbone is the growing of swee tpotoes . The area is predominantly inhabited by Kipsigis community which with few others mainly in businesses and working there.There has been high tension in terms of politics since but has never disrupted peace.

References

Constituencies in Rift Valley Province
Constituencies in Narok County